Northeastern University has had 7 presidents since it was founded in 1898.

List of presidents
Frank Palmer Speare, 1898–1940 (founder)
Carl Stephens Ell, 1940–1959
Asa Smallidge Knowles, 1959–1975
Kenneth Gilmore Ryder, 1975–1989
John Anthony Curry, 1989–1996
Richard M. Freeland, 1996–2006
Joseph E. Aoun, 2006–present

References

 
Northeastern University people
Northeastern University